Cogua is a municipality and town of Colombia in the department of Cundinamarca. Cogua borders Tausa in the north, Nemocón in the east, Pacho in the west and Zipaquirá in the south.

Etymology 
The name Cogua is derived from Chibcha and means "Support of the hill".

History 
Cogua in the times before the Spanish conquest was inhabited by the Muisca who lived on the Altiplano Cundiboyacense and had established an advanced civilization. Cogua is located between two important sources of salt in the Muisca economy; Zipaquirá and Nemocón.

Modern Cogua was founded on August 23, 1604 by Lorenzo de Terrones.

Economy 
Main economical activities of Cogua are agriculture and livestock farming. The Neusa Reservoir is located within the boundaries of Cogua.

Gallery

References

External links 

  FOTW: Flag and Seal of Cogua

Municipalities of Cundinamarca Department
Populated places established in 1604
1604 establishments in the Spanish Empire
Muisca Confederation
Muysccubun